Ulices Geovanni Briceño Pérez (born January 6, 1993, in Mérida, Yucatán) is a Mexican professional footballer who currently plays for Pioneros de Cancún on loan from Monterrey.

External links

1993 births
Living people
C.F. Monterrey players
C.F. Mérida footballers
Correcaminos UAT footballers
Venados F.C. players
Pioneros de Cancún footballers
Liga MX players
Ascenso MX players
Tercera División de México players
Sportspeople from Mérida, Yucatán
Footballers from Yucatán
Association football forwards
Mexican footballers